Labur is a village on the west coast of New Ireland, Papua New Guinea. It is located to the south of Kalagunan, on Labur Bay. It is located in Namatanai Rural LLG.

References

Populated places in New Ireland Province